The Cappelle-la-Grande Open is a chess tournament held every year in Cappelle-la-Grande, France, since 1985. It is usually played in the second half of February with an accelerated Swiss-system format in nine rounds. It is organized by the chess club L'Echiquier Cappellois and is played in the Palais des Arts of Cappelle-la-Grande.

It has become over the years one of the largest opens in the world, but in terms of average player strength slightly behind the Gibraltar Chess Festival or the Aeroflot Open of Moscow.

List of winners
 Note: with multiple first-place finishers, the winner on the Buchholz tie-break is listed first.

{| class="wikitable" style="text-align:left;"
|-
! #
!  Year             
! Winner(s)
! Points
! Players
|-
|  1  || 1985||   || style="text-align:center;"|6½ ||     68   
|-
|  2   || 1986  ||     || style="text-align:center;"|6 ||   106  
|-
|  3   || 1987  ||      || style="text-align:center;"|7 ||   115   
|-
|  4   || 1988  ||  || style="text-align:center;"|7½||  138  
|-
|  5   || 1989  ||    || style="text-align:center;"|7 ||   137
|-
|  6   || 1990  ||    || style="text-align:center;"|7½||   201  
|-
|  7   || 1991  ||   || style="text-align:center;"|8 ||   289  
|-
|  8   || 1992  ||  || style="text-align:center;"|8 ||  308  
|-
|  9   || 1993  ||  || style="text-align:center;"|7½||   416  
|-
| 10   || 1994 ||        || style="text-align:center;"|7 ||  401     
|-
| 11   || 1995 ||       || style="text-align:center;"|7 ||   572  
|-
| 12   || 1996 ||   || style="text-align:center;"|7½ ||  509   
|-
| 13   || 1997 ||                     || style="text-align:center;"|7 ||  504   
|-
| 14   || 1998 || || style="text-align:center;"|7½ ||  637   
|-
| 15   || 1999 ||      || style="text-align:center;"|7½||  615 
|-
| 16   || 2000 ||     || style="text-align:center;"|7½ ||  643   
|-
| 17   || 2001 ||     || style="text-align:center;"|7½||  702   
|-
| 18   || 2002 ||    || style="text-align:center;"|7½||  677   
|-
| 19   || 2003 ||              || style="text-align:center;"|7 ||  606   
|-
| 20   || 2004 ||            || style="text-align:center;"|7 ||  576     
|-
| 21   || 2005 ||    || style="text-align:center;"|7½||  589   
|-
| 22   || 2006 ||    || style="text-align:center;"|7½||  624   
|-
| 23   || 2007 ||          || style="text-align:center;"|7||  608   
|-
| 24   || 2008 ||                || style="text-align:center;"|7||  612   
|-
| 25   || 2009 || || style="text-align:center;"|7½||  610
|-
| 26   || 2010 || || style="text-align:center;"|7½||  652
|-
| 27   || 2011 || || style="text-align:center;"|7½||  573
|-
| 28   || 2012 ||          || style="text-align:center;"|7||  497
|-
| 29   || 2013 ||                || style="text-align:center;"|7||  564
|-
| 30   || 2014 ||   || style="text-align:center;"|7½||  604
|-
| 31   || 2015 ||   || style="text-align:center;"|7½||  555
|-
| 32   || 2016 || || style="text-align:center;"|7½||  538
|-
| 33  || 2017|||| style="text-align:center;"|8||  216
|-
| 34 || 2018|||| style="text-align:center;"|8||  360
|-
| 35 || 2019||||style="text-align:center;"|7½||  332
|}

References

External links
 Official web site
 Double attack from Lviv
 Complete results of edition 2011

Chess competitions
Chess in France
1985 in chess
Recurring sporting events established in 1985
1985 in French sport
1985 establishments in France